Frank John Gorshin Jr. (April 5, 1933 – May 17, 2005) was an American actor, comedian and impressionist. He made many guest appearances on The Ed Sullivan Show and Tonight Starring Steve Allen.

As an actor, he played the Riddler on the live-action television series Batman and was nominated for an Emmy Award for the performance.

Early life
Gorshin was born on April 5, 1933, in Pittsburgh, Pennsylvania, the son of Catholic parents Frances, a seamstress, and Frank Gorshin Sr., a railroad worker. He was of Slovenian ancestry. His father, Frank Sr., was a second-generation Slovenian-American whose parents emigrated to America from Slovenia. His mother, Frances or Fanny, née Prešeren, came to the United States as a young girl from Regrča Vas, near Novo Mesto, the main city of Lower Carniola, in Slovenia. Both of his parents were active in Pittsburgh's Slovenian community. They sang in the Slovenian Singing Society Prešeren, named after the great Slovenian poet France Prešeren.

In an interview, Frances said that her son, being the product of a Slovenian home, spoke mostly Slovene before going to school. At the age of 15, he took a part-time job as a cinema usher at the Sheridan Square Theatre. He memorized the mannerisms of the screen stars he saw and created an impressionist act. He was still in high school when he obtained his first paid employment, which he secured as the prize in a Pittsburgh talent contest in 1951: a one-week engagement at Jackie Heller's New York nightclub, Carousel. His parents insisted that he take the engagement, even though his 15-year-old brother had been hit by a car and killed just two nights before.

After graduation from Peabody High School, Gorshin attended the Carnegie Tech School of Drama (now known as Carnegie Mellon University) in Pittsburgh. When not studying, he worked in local plays and nightclubs.

In 1953, Gorshin was drafted into the United States Army and posted to Germany. He served for a year and a half as an entertainer attached to Special Services. While in the Army, Gorshin met Maurice Bergman, who later introduced him to Hollywood agent Paul Kohner. Gorshin's Army service record was later destroyed in the U.S. National Personnel Records Center fire of 1973.

Career
When Gorshin left the Army, he returned to public performance, and in 1956, he became a prolific film actor. He also appeared on various television series, including the role of Hank Butts, with Michael Landon cast as Jim Mason, in the 1958 episode "Shadow of Belle Starr" of the syndicated Western series Frontier Doctor, starring Rex Allen. In 1959, he was cast in three episodes as Seaman Pulaski on Jackie Cooper's CBS military sitcom/drama Hennesey. Thereafter, Gorshin played roles in ABC's crime drama The Untouchables. In 1961, Gorshin gave a tour de force performance as an impressionist who kills his fiancée under the influence of one of his celebrity characters in The Defenders. He guest-starred twelve times on CBS's The Ed Sullivan Show, the first having been on June 17, 1962. On February 9, 1964, the same night that The Beatles and Davy Jones debuted, he also appeared. In 1963, Gorshin had a guest-starring role in the long-running ABC military series Combat! as Pvt. Wharton who took false credit for the heroism of his dead friend, but redeemed himself later, saving Sgt. Saunders, as well as in 1965 in which he played Pvt. Gavin, a tank operator who had washed out of U.S. Army Armor tank operations training.

Gorshin was a popular act at nightclubs, notably those of Las Vegas, where he was the first impressionist to headline the main showrooms. He was also the first impressionist headliner at the Empire Room of New York's Waldorf-Astoria Hotel. Among his most popular impressions were of Burt Lancaster (exaggerating Lancaster's hand gestures) and Kirk Douglas (exaggerating Douglas' gritted teeth), as well as Marlon Brando (spoofing his squint). He was also popular for simulating bodily and facial resemblances, and pitch-perfect imitations of voice, accent, and vocal inflections and mannerisms. Gorshin's slender athletic build, wide mouth, and pale eyes under strong brows were ideal characteristics for screen henchmen.

In 1957, he fell asleep at the wheel of his car after driving from Pittsburgh for thirty-nine hours without sleep and subsequently, the vehicle crashed. He was on his way to a Hollywood screen test for the role of Petty Officer Ruby in Run Silent, Run Deep. He sustained a fractured skull and spent four days in a coma; a Los Angeles newspaper incorrectly reported that he had been killed. The role went to Don Rickles.

Gorshin's first film role was Between Heaven and Hell. In the late 1950s, Gorshin had roles in B-movies such as Hot Rod Girl (1956), Dragstrip Girl (1957) and Invasion of the Saucer Men (1957). In 1960, he was featured in Bells are Ringing, playing the Method Actor while doing a Marlon Brando impression. As a dramatic actor, he often played "tough guys" like those played by one of his favorite targets of impressions, James Cagney, whom he was said to resemble. He did take a comic turn, though, as the hipster jazz bassist Basil (paired with singer Connie Francis) in Where the Boys Are (1960), as a bumbling kidnapper in the Hayley Mills vehicle That Darn Cat! (1965), and as a boss-behind-bars for laughs in Otto Preminger's comedy Skidoo (1968).

In 1962, Gorshin was cast as Billy Roy Fix in the episode "The Fire Dancer" of the NBC modern Western television series Empire, starring Richard Egan as the rancher Jim Redigo.

He was nominated for an Emmy Award (Outstanding Performance by an Actor in a Supporting Role in a Comedy) for his role as the Riddler on ABC's 1960s live-action television series Batman, starring Adam West and Burt Ward. Gorshin's portrayal of the character included a high-pitched, deranged cackle, inspired by that of Tommy Udo (Richard Widmark) in Kiss of Death (1947). Gorshin disliked the Riddler's original unitard costume from the comics, and had a green business suit and bowler hat marked with question marks created as an alternative, a variant of which would be later adapted in the comics itself. He played the Riddler in ten episodes of the series as well as the theatrical film, although John Astin made two appearances in 1967 in the role on an occasion when Gorshin was unavailable. Gorshin was very angry about being replaced by Astin as the Riddler, but he agreed to return to Batman as the Riddler in Season 3 in an episode entitled "Ring Around The Riddler". He reprised the role in the 1979 television film Legends of the Superheroes.

Gorshin also had a memorable role in the 1969 Star Trek episode "Let That Be Your Last Battlefield" as the bigoted half-whiteface, half-blackface alien Bele from the planet Cheron. Contrary to popular rumor and several news articles, Gorshin did not receive an Emmy nomination for this role.

In the early 1970s, Gorshin appeared on Broadway in Jimmy (1969) and Guys and Dolls (1971). He made numerous guest-starring appearances on such television series as The Name of the Game (1969) Ironside (1974), Hawaii Five-O (1974), Get Christie Love! (1975), Charlie's Angels (1977) and Wonder Woman (1977). In 1979, he played interplanetary assassin Seton Kellogg in a two-part episode of the television series Buck Rogers in the 25th Century titled "Plot to Kill a City".

In 1982, Gorshin acted and sang the role of irascible King Gama in a TV production of the Gilbert and Sullivan opera Princess Ida (as part of the PBS series The Compleat Gilbert and Sullivan, and subsequently in live performance at other venues.

He also appeared as the villainous Dan Wesker in the miniseries Goliath Awaits (1981); and played the role of Smiley Wilson on the ABC soap opera The Edge of Night (1981–82), where he used his impersonation talents to mimic other performers on the series. During this decade, he also guest starred in episodes of series such as The Fall Guy (1984), Murder, She Wrote (1988) and Monsters (1989).

During the 1990s, he featured as a mobster kingpin in The Meteor Man (1993), played the evil sorcerer Brother Septimus in "The Tale of the Carved Stone" episode of Are You Afraid of the Dark? (1993), voiced the character of Reverend Jack Cheese in an episode of The Ren and Stimpy Show (1995). Notably, he appeared in Terry Gilliam's 12 Monkeys (1995) as the gruff superior to Madeleine Stowe's psychiatrist.

In his final years, Gorshin portrayed the famous comedian George Burns on Broadway in the one-man show Say Goodnight, Gracie (2002), which was nominated for a 2003 Tony Award for best play and was reunited with several of his Batman colleagues in the television film Return to the Batcave: The Misadventures of Adam and Burt, in which he appeared as himself. Gorshin died on the day of the telefilm's DVD release. He played the strict legendary Harvard Law School Professor, John H. Keynes, in the Korean drama Love Story in Harvard (2004), and voiced villain Hugo Strange in three 2005 episodes of The Batman animated series. He also voiced the characters Marius and Lysander in the computer role playing game Diablo II.

Gorshin's last television appearance was in "Grave Danger", an episode of the CBS series CSI: Crime Scene Investigation which aired two days after his death; the episode, which was directed by Quentin Tarantino, was dedicated to his memory. While he was known for his impressions, his role on CSI was as himself.

Gorshin's final role was as a voice actor in the unreleased animated feature film Firedog.

Personal life
On April 8, 1957, Gorshin married Christina Randazzo. They had one son, Mitchell, and later separated but remained married until his death.

Death
Gorshin's final live appearance was a Memphis performance of Say Goodnight, Gracie, in which he portrayed George Burns. He finished the performance and boarded a plane for Los Angeles on April 25, 2005. After he experienced severe breathing difficulty during the flight, the crew administered emergency oxygen. An ambulance met the plane upon landing and Gorshin was transported to a Burbank hospital, where he died three weeks later, on May 17, 2005, aged 72 from lung cancer, complicated by emphysema and pneumonia. Gorshin had been a heavy smoker for most of his adult life, consuming up to five packs of cigarettes a day. His Batman co-star Adam West once claimed that "Frank could reduce a cigarette to ash with one draw." When Gorshin appeared in nightclubs or other live performances, audiences were warned not to attend if they disliked smoking, as he often smoked onstage.

Gorshin is interred at Calvary Catholic Cemetery in the Hazelwood section of Pittsburgh.

Filmography

Film

Television

Video games

Stage appearances
 What Makes Sammy Run? playing Sammy Glick at Valley Music Theatre (Los Angeles) (1966)
 Jimmy playing James J. Walker at Winter Garden Theatre (Broadway) (1969)
 The Prisoner of Second Avenue playing Mel Edison at Parker Playhouse (Florida) (1973)
 Whodunnit standing in as Andreas Capodistriou at Biltmore Theatre (Broadway) (1982)
 On the Twentieth Century playing Oscar Jaffe on a tour of the United States (1986)
 Ah, Wilderness! playing Nat Miller at American Heartland Theatre (Kansas City, Mo.) (1987)
 Best of Burlesque, sketch comedy and impressionist, Showboat Dinner Theater, Clearwater, FL (1994)
 Guys and Dolls as a performer in Las Vegas (1995)
 The Sunshine Boys as Willie Clark on a tour of the United States (2001)
 Say Goodnight, Gracie as George Burns at Helen Hayes Theatre (Broadway) (2002)

Discography
"The Riddler", composed by Mel Torme, B-side "Never Let Her Go" composed by David A. Gates 1966

References

External links

 
 
 
 

 

1933 births
2005 deaths
American male comedians
20th-century American comedians
American impressionists (entertainers)
American male film actors
American male musical theatre actors
American male stage actors
American male television actors
American male voice actors
American people of Slovenian descent
American Roman Catholics
Liberty Records artists
Male actors from Pittsburgh
Military personnel from Pittsburgh
Burials at Calvary Catholic Cemetery (Pittsburgh)
Carnegie Mellon University College of Fine Arts alumni
Deaths from emphysema
Deaths from lung cancer in California
United States Army soldiers
Carnegie Mellon University alumni
20th-century American male actors
20th-century American male singers
20th-century American singers